Foni Bintang-Karenai is one of the nine districts of the Gambia's Western Division, which is located to the south of the Gambia River in the southwest of the country. Foni Bintang-Karenai is in the central south of the division, between Foni Kansala and Foni Brefet.

References 

West Coast Division (The Gambia)
Districts of the Gambia